Banayurt (Booni-Yurt) is a rural locality (a selo) in Novolaksky District, Republic of Dagestan, Russia. The population was 1,036 as of 2010. There are 18 streets.

Geography 
Banayurt is located 19 km southwest of Khasavyurt, on the left bank of the Yamansu River. Yamansu and Barchkhoyotar are the nearest rural localities.

Nationalities 
Chechens live there.

References 

Rural localities in Novolaksky District